Lueders-Avoca Independent School District is a public school district based in Lueders, Texas (USA).

In addition to Lueders, the district serves the unincorporated communities of Avoca and Nugent in eastern Jones County. A portion of Shackelford County also lies within the district.

Lueders-Avoca ISD has two schools - Lueders-Avoca High (Grades 9-12; located in Avoca) and Lueders-Avoca Elementary/Junior High (Grades PK-8; located in Lueders).

Academic achievement
In 2009, the school district was rated "recognized" by the Texas Education Agency.

Special programs

Athletics
Lueders-Avoca High School plays six-man football.

See also

List of school districts in Texas

References

External links
Lueders-Avoca ISD

School districts in Jones County, Texas
School districts in Shackelford County, Texas